Nqoko ka Gcaleka (about 1770 - 1822) was a regent and king of the Xhosa nation.

Nqoko was the third son of Gcaleka ka Phalo and took over the throne as regent when his oldest brother King Khawuta ka Gcaleka died in 1804 and served until 1820 when his nephew Hintsa ka Khawuta took over.

Nqoko died in 1822.

Xhosa people
Rulers of the Gcaleka
1730 births
1792 deaths